Balagarh Bijoy Krishna Mahavidyalaya (Jirat College) (informally known as BBKM), established in 1985, is the general degree college located in Jirat, India. The college was founded by Sri Bijoy Krishna Modak. Sri Bijoy Krishna Modak was a Political and Social Worker. The college offers undergraduate courses in Arts, Commerce and Science. The campus is in the Hooghly District. It is affiliated to  University of Burdwan.

Departments

Science

Physics
Mathematics
Computer Science ( Only General Stream)

Arts and Commerce

Bengali
English
History
Geography
Political Science
Philosophy
Commerce

Accreditation
In 2016 Balagarh Bijoy Krishna Mahavidyalaya has been awarded C grade by the National Assessment and Accreditation Council (NAAC). The college is also recognized by the University Grants Commission (UGC).

See also

References

External links
Balagarh Bijoy Krishna Mahavidyalaya

Universities and colleges in Hooghly district
Colleges affiliated to University of Burdwan
Educational institutions established in 1985
1985 establishments in West Bengal